Bitstrips was a media and technology company based in Toronto, Canada, and founded in 2007 by Jacob Blackstock, David Kennedy, Shahan Panth, Dorian Baldwin, and Jesse Brown. The company's web application, Bitstrips.com, allowed users to create comic strips using personalized avatars, and preset templates and poses. Brown and Blackstock explained that the service was meant to enable self-expression without the need to have artistic skills. Bitstrips was first presented in 2008 at South by Southwest in Austin, Texas, and the service later piloted and launched a version designed for use as educational software. The service achieved increasing prominence following the launch of versions for Facebook and mobile platforms.

In 2014, Bitstrips launched a spin-off app known as Bitmoji, which allows users to create personalized stickers for use in messaging apps. In July 2016, Snap, Inc. announced that it had acquired the company; the Bitstrips comic service was shut down, but Bitmoji remains operational, and has subsequently been given greater prominence within Snapchat's overall platform.

History 
Bitstrips was co-developed by Toronto-based comic artist Jacob Blackstock and his high school friend, journalist Jesse Brown. The service was originally envisioned as a means to allow anyone to create their own comic strip without needing artistic skills. Brown explained that "it's so difficult and time-consuming to tell a story in comic book form, drawing the same characters again and again in these tiny little panels, and just the amount of craftsmanship required. And even if you can do it well, which I never could, it takes years to make a story." Brown stated that the service would be "groundwork for a whole new way to communicate", and went as far as describing the service as being a "YouTube for comics". Blackstock explained that the concept of Bitstrips was influenced by his own use of comics as a form of socialization; a student, Blackstock and his friends drew comics featuring each other and shared them during classes. He felt that Bitstrips was a "medium for self-expression", stating that "It's not just about you making the comics, but since you and your friends star in these comics, it's like you're the medium. The visual nature of comics just speaks so much louder than text."

The service was publicly unveiled at South by Southwest in 2008. In 2009, the service introduced a version oriented towards the educational market, Bitstrips for Schools, which was initially piloted at a number of schools in Ontario. The service was praised by educators for being engaging to students, especially within language classes. Brown noted that students were using the service to create comics outside of class as well, stating that it was "so gratifying and shocking what people do with your tool to make their own stories in ways that you never would have anticipated. Some of them are just brilliant."

In December 2012, Bitstrips launched a version for Facebook; by July 2013, Bitstrips had 10 million unique users on Facebook, having created over 50 million comics. In October 2013, Bitstrips launched a mobile app; in two months, Bitstrips became a top-downloaded app in 40 countries, and over 30 million avatars had been created with it. In November 2013, Bitstrips secured a round of funding from Horizons Ventures and Li Ka-shing.

In October 2014, Bitstrips launched Bitmoji, a spin-off app that allows users to create stickers featuring Bitstrips characters in various templates.

In July 2016, following unconfirmed reports earlier in the year, Snap, Inc. announced that it had acquired Bitstrips. The company's staff continue to operate out of Toronto, but the original Bitstrips comic service was shut down in favour of focusing exclusively on Bitmoji. Following the acquisition, Snapchat's app was updated to integrate with Bitmoji, allowing users to link their accounts between the two apps and add Bitmoji to their posts. In September 2017, animated, 3D rendered Bitmoji were introduced to Snapchat's augmented reality "World Lenses" feature.

Since the Snap acquisition, Bitmoji has seen significant growth; in April 2017, it was reported that Bitmoji was the most-downloaded app on the iOS App Store in Australia, Canada, France, the United Kingdom, and the United States. In December 2017, Apple stated that Bitmoji was the most-downloaded iOS app worldwide in 2017, followed in second place by Snapchat itself. The following month, Bitmoji released an update branded as "Bitmoji Deluxe", which includes a wider array of customization options.

In June 2018, Snap launched its development platform Snap Kit, which includes the ability to offer access to Bitmoji stickers within third-party services with a Snapchat connection. In April 2019, Snap announced a new multiplayer mobile game within the Snapchat app known as Bitmoji Party, where players use their Bitmoji characters in-game. Later that month, Snap announced a new software development kit for selected partners.

See also

References

External links 
 

Online companies of Canada
Mobile applications
Companies based in Toronto
Internet properties established in 2007
Internet properties disestablished in 2016
Snap Inc.
2016 mergers and acquisitions